Kabuscorp Sport Clube do Palanca, usually known simply as Kabuscorp is a multisports club based in Luanda, Angola. The club's football teams contests at the Angolan major league Girabola as well as at the African club competitions.

Kabuscorp is an acronym for Kangamba Business Corporation, a business ranging from transports to diamond exploration run by club owner Bento Kangamba.

Kabuscorp S.C. was founded in 1994 by president and club owner Bento Kangamba. The club plays their home matches at the state-owned Estádio dos Coqueiros in Luanda and is renowned for their cheerful supporters, mostly of bakongo origin.

History

In 2008, in their first appearance in Girabola they finished in 10th position.

The club's greatest achievement came 6 years later, when they won the 2013 Girabola with a record 73 points, thus qualifying to the 2014 CAF Champions League.
In 2014, Kabuscorp won the Angolan Supercup beating Petro de Luanda by 3–1.

2012 road accident
On August 4, 2012, twenty three fans of Kabuscorp do Palanca club died and 29 others injured, following a road accident on the road connecting the provinces of Kwanza Norte and Luanda. The accident occurred when a bus carrying the supporters of Palanca club was returning from the town of Calulo, coastal Kwanza sul province, after a football match opposing home side Recreativo do Libolo and Kabuscorp.
The match was part of the 20th round of national league's first division, Girabola 2012, which ended with a 2–0 victory for the host team.

2018 penalties
In May, FIFA has instructed the Angolan Football Federation that Kabuscorp should forfeit 6 points in the 2018 league as a result of being in default to their former star player Rivaldo. In a weekly report issued by the Angolan federation, it is further stated that the club may be banned from official competition in case the claimant files a new complaint.

In June, FIFA again ruled that Kabuscorp forfeits an additional 6 points in the league for being in default with DRC's TP Mazembe in the 2014 deal with Trésor Mputu.

2018–19 penalties
Kabuscorp forfeited 9 points, for failing to address payment claims by a total 6 individuals, following a 15-day deadline stipulated by the Angolan Football Federation (FAF). The first case includes former player Adawá Mokanga, the second case includes former staff members Afonso Paxe Filho, Dombasi João, Kutama Shabani and former head-coach Romeu Filemón whereas the third case refers to former club physician Dr. Caetano Maria.

In May, the Angolan Football Federation received a letter from FIFA ordering Kabuscorp to be relegated for failing to meet payment claims by former player Rivaldo. Even though the debt has reportedly been paid in full, Kabuscorp failed to pay within the established deadline. The club faced a second relegation penalty regarding their dispute with TP Mazembe.

Dissolution 
In 12 March, 2022, the club's president Bento Kangamba announced the club would forfeit from Girabola and would be dissolved, due to the constant penalties applied by the Angolan Football Federation.

Notable players

On January 15, 2012, the 1999 FIFA World Player of the Year and European Footballer of the Year Rivaldo, signed a one-year contract with the club.

Albert Meyong,  was a decisive player in Kabuscorp's first titles being the club's top scorer.

Achievements
Angolan League: 1 
2013
Angolan SuperCup: 1 
2014

Recent seasons
Kasburcop's season-by-season performance since 2015:

 PR = Preliminary round, 1R = First round, GS = Group stage, R32 = Round of 32, R16 = Round of 16, QF = Quarter-finals, SF = Semi-finals

League and cup positions

Performance in CAF competitions
CAF Champions League: 1 appearance
2014 – First Round

Players and staff

Players

Staff

Manager history

See also
 Kabuscorp Handball
 Girabola
 Gira Angola

References

External links
 Girabola.com profile
 Zerozero.pt profile
 Soccerway profile
 Facebook profile

 
Football clubs in Angola
Football clubs in Luanda
Sports clubs in Angola